Södermanland Brigade, also PB 10 or MekB 10, was a Swedish Army armoured brigade located in the province of Södermanland. Most of the brigade was trained at Södermanland regiment. The brigade was decommissioned in 2000

History 
In 1963, the brigade was converted from an infantry brigade into an armoured brigade. The unit was disbanded as a result of the disarmament policies set forward in the Defence Act of 2000.

Heraldry and traditions
The Södermanland Brigade shared heraldry and traditions with Södermanland Regiment.

Coat of arms
The coat of the arms of the Södermanland Brigade (MekB 10) 1994–2000. It was also used by the Södermanland Regiment (P 10/Fo 43) 1977–1994 and the Södermanland Regiment (P 10) 2000–2004. Blazon: "Or, the provincial badge of Södermanland, a griffin segreant, sable, armed and langued gules. The shield surmounted two arms in fess, embowed and vambraced, the hands holding swords in saltire, or".

Commanding officers
1943–1974: ?
1983–198?: Colonel Björn Bernroth
198?–1994: 
1991–1994: Colonel Ulf Henricsson
1995–1997: Colonel Lars Bergström
1998–2000: Colonel Fhleming Christensen

Names, designations and locations

See also
 List of Swedish Army brigades

Footnotes

References

Notes

Print

Brigades of the Swedish Army
Military units and formations established in 1943
Military units and formations disestablished in 2000
Disbanded units and formations of Sweden
1943 establishments in Sweden
2000 disestablishments in Sweden
Strängnäs Garrison